Christoph Bach (born 1975) is a German actor, living in Berlin. He was born in Reutlingen, and received his education at Universität der Künste in Berlin.

Bach had notable roles in the TV miniseries Carlos and in the German film 15 Minuten Wahrheit. He portrayed Werner Heisenberg in the 2015 TV series The Heavy Water War and 2017 in German television series Charité German physician Paul Ehrlich.

References

1975 births
Living people
German male actors
People from Reutlingen